This article provides a list of cultural references to the work of author H. P. Lovecraft. These references are collectively known as the Cthulhu Mythos. For works that are stylistically Lovecraftian, including comics and film adaptations influenced by Lovecraft, see Lovecraftian horror.

Film 
Films based on, or inspired by, the writings of H. P. Lovecraft include the following.

The Haunted Palace (1963), directed by Roger Corman, starring Vincent Price, and with Lon Chaney Jr. Marketed as "Edgar Allan Poe's The Haunted Palace", the film is actually based on The Case of Charles Dexter Ward, and also includes elements taken from The Shadow over Innsmouth and "The Dunwich Horror".
Die, Monster, Die! (1965), directed by Daniel Haller, and starring Boris Karloff and Nick Adams. An adaptation of "The Colour Out of Space".
Curse of the Crimson Altar (1968), directed by Vernon Sewell, and starring Boris Karloff and Christopher Lee.  Released in the U.S. as The Crimson Cult.  Loosely based on "The Dreams in the Witch House.
The Dunwich Horror (1970), directed by Daniel Haller, and starring Sandra Dee, Dean Stockwell, and Ed Begley. Based on the short story of the same name.
Re-Animator (1985), directed by Stuart Gordon, and starring Jeffrey Combs, Bruce Abbott, Barbara Crampton, and David Gale. An adaptation of "Herbert West—Reanimator".
From Beyond (1986), directed by Stuart Gordon, and starring Jeffrey Combs, Barbara Crampton, and Ken Foree. Based on the short story of the same name.
The Curse (1987), directed by David Keith, and starring Wil Wheaton. Based on "The Colour Out of Space".
The Unnamable (1988), directed by Jean-Paul Ouellette and starring Mark Kinsey Stephenson. Based on the short story of the same name.
Bride of Re-Animator (1990), directed by Brian Yuzna and starring Jeffrey Combs, Bruce Abbott, Claude Earl Jones, David Gale, and Kathleen Kinmont.  A sequel to Re-Animator, it is also based on "Herbert West—Reanimator". 
The Resurrected (1991), directed by Dan O'Bannon and starring John Terry, Jane Sibbett, and Chris Sarandon. Based on The Case of Charles Dexter Ward.
Cast a Deadly Spell (1991), directed by Martin Campbell and starring Fred Ward, Julianne Moore, David Warner, and Clancy Brown. An original story that combines the Cthulhu mythos with a film noir detective mystery.
The Unnamable II: The Statement of Randolph Carter (1992), directed by Jean-Paul Ouellette and starring Mark Kinsey Stephenson. The film combines story elements from "The Unnameable" and "The Statement of Randolph Carter".
Necronomicon (1993), an anthology of three stories based on "The Rats in the Walls", "Cool Air", and The Whisperer in Darkness, with a framing story featuring a fictionalized H. P. Lovecraft.
In the Mouth of Madness (1994), directed by John Carpenter and starring Sam Neill, Julie Carmen, and Jürgen Prochnow, the film is set in the Cthulhu Mythos but is not derived from any Lovecraft work. Instead, it explores the insanity and the lines between reality and fantasy, much in the way that Lovecraft's 1936 novella At the Mountains of Madness does.
Castle Freak (1995), directed by Stuart Gordon and starring Jeffrey Combs and Barbara Crampton. Inspired by "The Outsider".
Cthulhu (2000), a low-budget Australian production directed by Damian Heffernan. It combines elements of the 1931 novella The Shadow over Innsmouth and the 1937 short story "The Thing on the Doorstep".
Dagon (2001), directed by Stuart Gordon and starring Ezra Godden, Francisco Rabal, and Raquel Meroño. Based on The Shadow over Innsmouth.
Beyond Re-Animator (2003), directed by Brian Yuzna and starring Jeffrey Combs, Jason Barry, and Elsa Pataky.  The third movie of the Re-Animator trilogy, loosely based on "Herbert West—Reanimator".
The Call of Cthulhu (2005), a silent black-and-white featurette designed to look like it was released in the late 1920s, when the short story "The Call of Cthulhu" was published.
Cthulhu (2007), directed by Daniel Gildark, and starring Jason Cottle, Cara Buono, and Tori Spelling. Based on The Shadow over Innsmouth.
The Last Lovecraft: Relic of Cthulhu (2009), directed by Henry Saine, and starring Kyle Davis.  A comedy horror film, with an original story set amidst the Chulthu Mythos.
The Whisperer in Darkness (2011), a black-and-white film designed to look like it was released in the 1930s. Based on the short story of the same name.
Howard Lovecraft and the Frozen Kingdom (2016), Howard Lovecraft and the Undersea Kingdom (2017), and Howard Lovecraft and the Kingdom of Madness (2018) are animated movies that are based on graphic novels inspired by the writings of Lovecraft.
Color Out of Space (2020), directed by Richard Stanley and starring Nicolas Cage. Based on "The Colour Out of Space".
The Deep Ones (2020), an independent production directed by Chad Ferrin which provides an updated retelling of the 1931 Lovecraft novella The Shadow over Innsmouth.

Tabletop games

Video games

Music

Print

Television

Comics 
 Abyssal Albion ongoing series set within a post-apocalypse where Cthulhu mythos creatures are real. 
 Fall of Cthulhu
 Kodoja
 Neonomicon
 Providence
 The Marvel universe includes Lovecraftian horrors based on the Cthulhu mythos such as Shuma Gorath who is a part of the Many Angled ones.
 The DC universe also includes Lovecraftian horrors such as Starro, Anti-Monitor, and Nekron.
 The Hellboy Universe also had some Lovecraftian horrors Like the Ogdru-Jahad and its offspring Ogdru-Hem
 Witchblade and The Darkness feature the titular Darkness and its counterpart the Angeleus who mated to make the Witchblade.
 邪神伝説 クトゥルフの呼び声/Jashin densetsu Cthulhu no yobigoe is a Japanese manga illustrated by Yousuke Miyazaki. November 2009
 Leviathan, written by Ian Edginton and drawn by D'Israeli, published in 2000AD in 2003, tells of ship's architect William Ashbless who holds Hastur's soul imprisoned and uses it to power the huge ocean liner he has designed and built.
 Richard Corben's Neverwhere (1978) has a god Uhluhtc, Cthulhu spelled backwards.

Other
 The 153rd episode of the Thrilling Adventure Hour podcast features an episode titled "When Cthulu Cthalls", which was recorded on September 7, 2013 and released on February 17, 2014. The episode is part of the "Beyond Belief" series and features stars Frank and Sadie Doyle protecting their friend's baby from chipper cultists and an entity only referred to as "The Old One". The Old One/Cthulhu is voiced by Parks and Recreation star Jim O'Heir.
 Miskatonic Brewing Company is a brewpub in Darien, Illinois.  It is named after the Miskatonic River and Miskatonic University in Arkham, Massachusetts, which are fictional settings for some of Lovecraft's stories.
 The BBC Radio 4 podcast series The Lovecraft Investigations (2019–2020) is a modern-day adaptation of The Case of Charles Dexter Ward, Whisperer in Darkness, and The Shadow over Innsmouth.

See also
Cthulhu Mythos anthology

References

Popular culture
Literature in popular culture
Horror fiction lists
Weird fiction